Svatantra Microfin Svatantra, which means freedom in Hindi, is a mid-size Indian microfinance organisation based in Mumbai. Since receiving a license from the Reserve Bank of India in 2013, Svatantra has provided financial and non-financial solutions to encourage entrepreneurship in rural areas, primarily amongst women.

History
Svatantra Microfin was founded in 2012 by Ananya Birla, Co-Chairperson of ASSOCHAM’s Microfinance Council of India and daughter of Indian industrialist Kumar Mangalam Birla. Svatantra was established with an aim to address the growing income gap in India, and the company is dedicated towards the financial inclusion of rural women.

In 2014, the organisation won Gold Award in the start-up category by the Skoch Financial Inclusion and Deepening Award.

Company declared profitability in three and a half years.

Svatantra was the first microfinance institution to receive the Non-Banking Financial Company – Microfinance Institution (NBFC-MFI) license from the Reserve Bank of India. Beginning 2016, ICRA rated Svatanta A- with stable outlook for the Rs. 100.00 crore bank facilities and an MFI grade of M3+ stating that the company is able manage its microfinance activities in a sustainable manner.

In 2017, Svatantra launched Saathi, an end-to-end cashless solution. Svatantra also uses Aadhaar to determine credit score, using biometric identification. Company also has a mediclaim product.

Svatantra has 100% cashless disbursements and has the lowest lending rates of any MFI in India.

Svatantra Microfin has Rs 570 crore assets under management. The company has 190+ branches spread across 10-12 states. The company is currently funded by nine financial institutions, including public and private sector banks and NBFCs.

Application of Microcredit
Svatantra's microcredit policy is based on a group lending model where members take unsecured loans to fund a business or other income generating activity and stand guarantee for one another in their group ensuring credit discipline and prompt repayments through peer pressure.

It offers livelihood-related loans at 19.25-20.00% interest rate, lowest in India. It disburses money through National Electronic Funds Transfer (NEFT); and also helps its clients open bank accounts, adhering to one of its core missions of financial inclusion.

References

Microfinance companies of India